The Richard I. Bong Memorial Bridge, also known as the Bong Bridge, connects Duluth, Minnesota, and Superior, Wisconsin, via U.S. Highway 2 (US 2). It crosses the Saint Louis Bay, which drains into Lake Superior. The bridge rises 120 feet above the river to accommodate maritime traffic in a 400-foot-wide navigation channel. The Bong Bridge is one of two connecting Duluth and Superior. A through-arch bridge downstream from the Bong -- the John A. Blatnik Bridge -- carries Interstate 535 (I-535) over the water.

History 
The bridge's namesake, Richard Ira Bong, was a pilot in the U.S. Army Air Corps during World War II who was named the United States' all-time "Ace of Aces". The designer of the bridge was fellow World War II veteran Amardo J. "Marty" Romano. The bridge was originally to be named Arrowhead Bridge, after the old wood trestle–bascule bridge it replaced.

Construction on the bridge began in 1982, and it was opened on October 25, 1985.

The bridge is one of the largest public works projects undertaken by the state of Wisconsin. Ayres Associates, an architectural/engineering company based in Eau Claire, Wisconsin, managed the project and designed the  length of approach bridges. The Wisconsin Department of Transportation designed the channel span (tied arch). Its central suspension section is made of Japanese steel.

In 2007, the Bong Bridge won a Wonders of Wisconsin Engineering Award from the American Council of Engineering Companies, Wisconsin Chapter, which was celebrating its 50th anniversary.

Accident 
The bridge was the scene of a 16-vehicle pile-up on January 27, 2005, in which 10 people were hospitalized and a baby was given an emergency delivery but subsequently died.

See also

References 

Bong Memorial Bridge
Bong Memorial Bridge
Buildings and structures in Duluth, Minnesota
Transportation in Duluth, Minnesota
Buildings and structures in Douglas County, Wisconsin
Bong
U.S. Route 2
Bridges of the United States Numbered Highway System
Superior, Wisconsin
Tied arch bridges in the United States
Steel bridges in the United States
1985 establishments in Minnesota
1985 establishments in Wisconsin